Tobias Berger (born 2 November 2001) is an Austrian professional footballer who plays as a left-back for Austrian Football Bundesliga club Austria Lustenau.

Club career

Early career
Berger began his career in 2010 with the youth academy of UPS Dorfgastein. He made his professional debut playing for Red Bull Salzburg's feeder team, Liefering, against Wacker Innsbruck II on 29 May 2019.

Austria Lustenau
On 7 January 2020, Berger joined SC Austria Lustenau on a deal until the summer 2021.

International career
Berger has represented Austria in various youth levels. He currently plays for the Austria under-18.

Honours
Red Bull Salzburg Youth
Jugendliga U18: 2019

Austria Lustenau
 Austrian Football Second League: 2021–22

References

External links 

 Austrian footballers
 Austria youth international footballers
2. Liga (Austria) players
2001 births 
Living people
FC Red Bull Salzburg players
SC Austria Lustenau players
Association football defenders